Mohamed Réda Halaïmia (born 28 August 1996) is an Algerian professional footballer who plays as a defender for MC Alger and the Algeria national team.

Career
In 2019, he joined Beerschot.

International career
Halaïmia made his debut with the Algeria national team in a friendly 1-0 win over Qatar on December 27, 2018.

Honours

Clubs
MC Oran
Algerian U21 Cup: 2017

K Beerschot VA
Belgian Second Division: 2020

International
Africa U-23 Cup of Nations: Runner-up 2015

References

External links
 

1996 births
Living people
Footballers from Oran
Algerian footballers
Algeria international footballers
Algerian expatriate footballers
Algerian Ligue Professionnelle 1 players
Belgian Pro League players
Challenger Pro League players
MC Oran players
K Beerschot VA players
Algeria under-23 international footballers
2015 Africa U-23 Cup of Nations players
Association football defenders
Algerian expatriate sportspeople in Belgium
Expatriate footballers in Belgium
21st-century Algerian people